Ohtlik lend (English: Dangerous Flight) is an Estonian television crime series. In the series, detective Andres (Marko Matvere) and his colleague Rita (Elisabet Reinsalu) solve crime cases. In the first series, the activities take place in Pärnu, and in the second session, in Tallinn.

The series is directed by Ain Prosa.

The series aired from 2006 until 2007 on Eesti Televisioon (ETV).

Cast
Marko Matvere as Detective Andres Västrik 
Elisabet Reinsalu	as Detective Rita Leidpalu 
Piret Kalda as  Katrin
Jaan Rekkor as Rein
Maria Klenskaja as Ella
Üllar Saaremäe	as Toomas 
Leino Rei as Marek
Karol Kuntsel as Rene
Ursula Ratasepp as Kaja
Argo Aadli	as Dan

References

Estonian television series
Eesti Televisioon original programming